Rabid is to be affected with rabies.

Rabid may also refer to:

 Rabid (band), a punk rock band from Leicester, England
 Rabid (1977 film), a Canadian-American horror film
 Rabid (2019 film), a Canadian horror film, a remake of the 1977 film

See also
 Rabies (disambiguation)
 Rabit (disambiguation)
 Rapid (disambiguation)